The 2006 IRB Pacific 5 Nations was the inaugural IRB Pacific 5 Nations rugby union competition held between five Pacific Rim sides; Fiji, Japan, Samoa, Tonga and the Junior All Blacks (New Zealand's second XV). The inaugural tournament kicked off on 3 June 2006 with the Junior All Blacks proclaimed the winner after their 38–8 defeat of Japan on 24 June 2006.

Australia was invited to take part but decided against sending a team as they wanted to focus on their domestic competition. However, Australia hosted two games, and Australian Rugby Union CEO Gary Flowers stated that Australia was keen to participate in the tournament from 2007 onwards. On 18 October 2006, it was announced that they would send their second XV. For this reason, the inaugural tournament was the only one to be known as the "Pacific 5 Nations", and from 2007 the competition was known as the Pacific Nations Cup.

Point system
The tournament is a round-robin of ten games, where each team plays one match against each of the other teams. There are four points for a win, two points for a draw and none for a defeat. There are also bonus points offered with one bonus point for scoring four or more tries in a match and one bonus point for losing by 7 points or less.

Table

Results
All kick off times are local.

Round 1

Round 2

Round 3
IRB Reports

Round 4
IRB Reports

Round 5
IRB Reports

Top scorers

Top points scorers

Source: irb.com

Top try scorers

Source: irb.com

See also 

2006 IRB Nations Cup
Pacific Tri-Nations

References

External links
 Junior All Blacks and Tonga continue winning ways, IRB official website, 10 June 2006

2006
2006 rugby union tournaments for national teams
2006 in Oceanian rugby union
2006 in New Zealand rugby union
2006 in Fijian rugby union
2006 in Tongan rugby union
2006 in Samoan rugby union
2005–06 in Japanese rugby union